Words of Afrikaans origin have entered other languages. British English has absorbed Afrikaans words primarily via British soldiers who served in the Boer Wars. Many more words have entered common usage in South African English due to the parallel nature of the English and Afrikaner cultures in South Africa. Afrikaans words have unusual spelling patterns.

Most of these words describe the African flora, fauna or landscape.

Internationally common

 Afrikaans (noun: name of language, from "african") derivative: Afrikaner (person who speaks Afrikaans as their native tongue), plural: Afrikaners
 apartheid (literally "apart-ness"): also the name of a period of segregation in the country during 1948–1994
 bergwind (warm dry wind blowing from the plateau to the coast)
 biltong (literally "rump tongue/strip"): dried cured red-meat, similar to Jerky. Has a boerewors equivalent known as Droëwors
 Boer (literally "farmer"): due to the large number of Afrikaans-speaking farmers, the term is exclusively used among Afrikaners for displaying national pride.
 boerewors (literally "farmer's sausage"): a juicy mixed-spice and mixed-meat sausage
 Highveld: a raised plateau stretching from the eastern side of the Free State (province) up north including the provinces of Gauteng and North West. Due to its location in Gauteng, the city of Johannesburg is the highest urban settlement by elevation
 ja (literally "yes")
 kraal (African village within a stockade, from Portuguese curral)
 kommando (originally a mounted infantry unit raised to retrieve stolen livestock)
 kop, or koppie (literally "head" or "cup", an African monadnock): Koppie can also refer to a small hill.
 laager (a collection of vehicles in a circle, meant for protection)
 lapa  A thatched roof structure supported by wooden poles. Lapas are commonly used as semi-open entertainment areas.
 rand  (literally "edge", "rim" or "ridge"): also the name of the South African currency, named after the Witwatersrand (White waters' ridge)
 rooibos (literally "red bush"): a bush, endemic to South Africa, used to make a herbal tea also called rooibos
 rondavel A round hut
 sjambok (an ox-hide whip): used by the South African Police Service for riot control, formerly used as a disciplinary tool for misbehaving school children
 spoor (literally "tracks" or "footprints"): the Afrikaans "spoorweë" refers specifically to the National Train Route, often indirectly as the train-tracks as well.
 trek (literally "draw", or "haul"):  Popularized in English by "Die Groot Trek" (The Great Trek)
 veld (literally "field" or natural African bush vegetation)
 ystervarkies (literally "iron piglets"; translates as porcupine/hedgehog), the South African name for Lamingtons

Common names
Afrikaans (or Cape Dutch) common names for plants and animals often entered the English vernacular:
 aardvark (literally "earth pig"): Also known as an Anteater
 aardwolf (literally "earth wolf")
 boomslang (literally "tree snake"): A highly venomous bright green tree snake
 blesbok  (literally "bald buck")
 bontebok  (literally "mottled buck")
 dassie (from Dutch, English translation Hyrax; see also dassie rat)
 duiker (literally "diver")
 eland (from Dutch, meaning "elk"): The largest known species of antelope
 grysbok (literally "grey buck")
 klipspringer (literally "rock jumper")
 korhaan (from Dutch, meaning "black grouse")
 leguan / leguaan (corruption of "likkewaan")
 meerkat  (literally "lake cat")
 padloper (literally "path walker")
 platanna (from Dutch "plathander", meaning "flat handed creature")
 rinkhals  (literally "ring throat"): also known as the ring-necked spitting cobra
 springbok (literally "jumping buck"): The National Animal of South Africa
white, in "white rhinoceros", possibly from wyd meaning "wide" (describing the animal's mouth) Modern Afrikaans also say "Wit Renoster", meaning White Rhinoceros.

Cape Dutch
There are also several English words derived from Cape Dutch, a forerunner of Afrikaans:
 hartebeest (modern Afrikaans equivalent is hartebees)
scoff/skoff (as in scoffing food): from Cape Dutch schoff, the word did not find its way into modern Afrikaans
 veldt borrowed again by English in the modern form veld
 wildebeest (modern Afrikaans equivalent is wildebees)

Common in South African English 
There are almost innumerable borrowings from Afrikaans in South African English.

See also

 South African English
 List of South African slang words

References

External links
 Low Germanic loanwords in modern English

Afrikaans
Afrikaans
South Africa-related lists